Gary Charness (born February 3, 1950) is Professor of Economics and the Director of the Experimental and Behavioral Economics Laboratory in the Department of Economics at the University of California, Santa Barbara.  Charness is an economist and social scientist, specializing in experimental and behavioral work; he is currently ranked 3rd in the world by RePEc in the field of experimental economics and has published nearly 80 academic articles.  Charness is a contributor to several areas of economic research, including social preferences, identity and group membership, communication and beliefs, behavioral interventions, group decision-making, social networks, gender, and individual decision-making.  A centerpiece of his research has been to effect beneficial social outcomes in difficult economic environments.  Charness's work has been discussed and published in The New York Times and Science, as well as in other media.  Charness is married and has three children.

Biography

Early years
Charness was born in Chicago into a middle-class Jewish family. His grandparents left the Ukraine and Lithuania in the 1910s for the U.S. He attended elementary school on the Near North Side until his family moved to Skokie in 1962. In his early years, he wished to be a scientist and a baseball player; these interests manifested in his becoming a social scientist in his 40s and playing competitive senior softball. He attended junior high school and high school in Skokie, finishing at the top of his class and receiving a National Merit Scholarship. 
Charness received his B.S. from the University of Michigan in 1971, having completed the Honors program in Mathematics. While this program was geared towards producing math professors, he decided against graduate school in favor of traveling the world and learning about people.  After traveling Europe and the Middle East, he returned to the U.S. in late 1972 and relocated to San Francisco where he pursued a diverse array of occupations.

In the span of 20 years, Charness pursued (among other activities) being a semi-professional poker player, an importer of textile art from Indonesia, an options trader on the Pacific Exchange, and a real-estate broker, investor, and lender.

In the fall of 1990, Charness read a newspaper article about a Stanford professor winning a Nobel Prize and knew one of the colleagues (Paul Milgrom) interviewed for the piece, as they were both students in the Honors Mathematics program at Michigan. This spurred him to apply to the economics Ph.D. program at Berkeley.  He pushed his way into Berkeley, despite an initial rejection, and started the program in 1991.

Academic life
At Berkeley, Charness learned about experiments being used for research and saw this as an extension of poker playing, given the intuition developed about people in these two decades in the real world.  He decided to pursue research in this area and conducted experiments at Berkeley and Tucson for his dissertation, under the tutelage of Matthew Rabin and George Akerlof.  
Charness’ career in academia began with a visiting position at Pompeu Fabra in Barcelona in 1997. After commuting for three years between San Francisco and Barcelona (and floating free for another year), Gary accepted a position as an assistant professor at UCSB in 2001.

Within academia, Charness is known particularly for producing experimental designs to examine preferences, motivations, and incentives in economic settings.  Work on social preferences (e.g., Charness and Rabin, 2002) has helped to delineate underlying preferences for social distribution and reciprocity.  Work on cheap-talk communication (e.g., Charness, 2000, Charness and Dufwenberg, 2006, 2010, 2011, and Brandts, Charness, and Ellman, 2016) has illustrated when and how non-binding communication can be effective in achieving socially-optimal outcomes.  His research on incentivizing exercise (Charness and Gneezy, 2009) has helped to lead to programs for improving physical fitness.  Charness's research on social networks has highlighted the importance of exactly how people are connected in determining patterns of economic behavior.   Charness, Feri, Melendez-Jimenez, and Sutter (2014) won the prestigious Exeter Prize in 2015, for the best paper published in the previous calendar year in a peer-reviewed journal in the fields of Experimental Economics, Behavioral Economics and Decision Theory.

In addition to his research output (nearing 100 papers), Charness has served on a number of editorial boards at highly ranked journals.  This includes an eight-year stint at the American Economic Review and more than seven years at Management Science. He was appointed as an Editor at Games and Economic Behavior in February 2016.

Charness has travelled extensively within Europe for his research, going to notable places such as Rome, Barcelona, and Indonesia.

Selected publications

Charness, Gary (2000), “Self-serving Cheap Talk and Credibility: A Test of Aumann’s Conjecture,” Games and Economic Behavior, 33, 177–194.

Charness, Gary and Matthew Rabin (2002), “Understanding Social Preferences with Simple Tests,” Quarterly Journal of Economics, 117, 817–869.

Charness, Gary (2004), “Attribution and Reciprocity in an Experimental Labor Market,” Journal of Labor Economics, 22, 665–688.

Charness, Gary and Dan Levin (2005), “When Optimal Choices Feel Wrong: A Laboratory Study of Bayesian Updating, Complexity, and Affect,” American Economic Review, 95, 1300–1309.

Charness, Gary and Martin Dufwenberg (2006), “Promises and Partnership,” Econometrica, 74, 1579–1601.

Charness, Gary, Margarida Corominas-Bosch, and Guillaume Fréchette (2007), “Bargaining and Network Structure: An Experiment,” Journal of Economic Theory, 136, 28–65.

Charness, Gary, Luca Rigotti, and Aldo Rustichini (2007), “Individual Behavior and Group Membership,” American Economic Review, 97, 1340–1352.

Charness, Gary and Uri Gneezy (2009), “Incentives to Exercise,” Econometrica, 77, 909- 931.

Charness, Gary and Marie Claire Villeval (2009), “Cooperation and Competition in Intergenerational Experiments in the Field and the Laboratory,” American Economic Review, 99, 956–978.

Charness, Gary and Martin Dufwenberg (2011), “Participation,” American Economic Review, 101, 1211–1237.

Brandts, Jordi and Gary Charness (2011), “The Strategy versus the Direct-response Method: A First Survey of Experimental Comparisons,” Experimental Economics, 14, 375–398.

Charness, Gary and Matthias Sutter (2012), “Groups make Better Self-Interested Decisions,” Journal of Economic Perspectives, 26, 157–176.

Charness, Gary, David Masclet, and Marie Claire Villeval (2014), “The Dark Side of Status,” Management Science, 60, 38-55)

Charness, Gary, Ramón Cobo-Reyes and Natalia Jiménez (2014), “Identities, Selection, and Contributions in a Public-goods Game,” Games and Economic Behavior, 87, 322–338.

Charness, Gary, Francesco Feri, Miguel Meléndez-Jiménez, and Matthias Sutter (2014), “Experimental Games on Networks: Underpinnings of Behavior and Equilibrium Selection,” Econometrica, 82, 1615–1670.

Charness, Gary and Arthur Schram (2015), “Inducing Norms in Laboratory Allocation Choices,” Management Science, 61, 1531–1546.

Babcock, Philip, Kelly Bedard, Gary Charness, John Hartman, and Heather Royer (2015),“Letting Down the Team? Evidence of Social Effects of Team Incentives,” Journal of the European Economic Association, 13, 841–870.

Charness, Gary and Ernst Fehr (2015), “From the Lab to the Real World” Science, 350(6260), 512–513.

Brandts, Jordi, Gary Charness, and Matthew Ellman (2016), “Let’s Talk: How Communication Affects Contract Design,” Journal of the European Economic Association.

Criticism
From Feminist Economics

Julie A. Nelson, in the journal, "Feminist Economics", criticizes an article of Charness and Gneezy which finds, "The extremely robust statistics show that women are more risk averse than men." Charness and Gneezy make their case based on "The results of 15 different studies on risk-taking in investment, each of which gathered data by gender, and used the same very simple and easy-to-comprehend mechanism for eliciting risk preferences." Additionally, Charness and Gneezy state in their article, "Most of the data were not collected in order to study gender differences, but rather to study other hypotheses regarding investment behavior, ameliorating the issue of publication bias with respect to gender results."

In her criticism, Nelson claims the simple, extremely statistically robust experiments, with unbiased results, which were not purposed to study gender differences in the first place, do not accurately reflect differences (or lack thereof) in risk taking attitudes between men and women.

References

1950 births
Living people
21st-century American economists
University of California, Santa Barbara faculty
University of Michigan College of Literature, Science, and the Arts alumni